George Freedman (Brooklyn, New York, USA, 6 March 1936 – Sydney, NSW, Australia, 21 July 2016) was Australia's leading Interior Designer/ Interior Architect from 1970 until a younger generation became prominent in Sydney during the 1990s. Born in New York, where he studied architecture at Syracuse University, Freedman arrived in Sydney in 1968 and later designed many prestigious interiors, often including custom-made furniture. His notable interior schemes included executive suites for the Bank of New South Wales (1970) and the State Bank of New South Wales (1985), cultural institutions including Sydney's Powerhouse Museum, Museum of Applied Arts and Sciences, businesses, government premises, restaurants, residences and historic monuments, including a refurbishment of the Queen Victoria Building (2009).

In 2005, Freedman was described by The Sydney Morning Herald as 'the Godfather of Interior Design'. He was recognised by design and architecture industry experts for his daring and widely emulated combinations of colours, inventive uses of materials, attention to detail, and commitment to high-quality furnishings (often imported signature classics). He was respected also for his sophisticated understandings of optical perception and volumetric manipulations of interior space. For this reason he was highlighted by design writers as practising more like an architect than his colleagues who were educated as interior decorators and designers. Although he never finalised his American degree studies to register as an architect, Freedman worked repeatedly with Sydney's leading architects of the late-twentieth century—including Glenn Murcutt, Peter Stronach, Richard Johnson and Ken Woolley. He also trained some of Sydney's outstanding younger architects and designers—including Iain Halliday, Sam Marshall, Stephen Varady, William MacMahon, Arthur Collin, Robert Puflett, Tim Allison and his late-career partner, Ralph Rembel. In 2005 the Royal Australian Institute of Architects (NSW Chapter) awarded Freedman Rembel an Interior Architecture commendation for its design of executive offices at the AMP Insurance building overlooking Circular Quay.

The Design Institute of Australia (DIA) Hall of Fame is an enduring record of the pioneers, ambassadors and contributors to the Australian design industry. It showcases Australia’s design visionaries, leaders and unsung heroes and celebrates their significant contribution to Australia’s economic development and cultural identity. Signifying his outstanding body of work and contribution to the Australian design industry, Freedman along with Marsh were inducted into the 2019 DIA Hall of Fame, posthumous.

Freedman's 1970s and 1980s furniture designs, often finished with luxury European veneers and eye-catching flourishes, were often promoted in Australia's most stylish design magazines, especially Belle and Interior Design. His cocktail trolley for Bilson's restaurant (1988) is in the collection of Sydney's Museum of Applied Arts and Sciences. Over the next decades, Freedman alongside his partners worked to inject a new exuberance into the standard pattern of modern interiors. Unafraid to play with new materials and striking palettes, he designed a myriad of homes, restaurants, and offices in Sydney, known for a sense of sophistication and modernity.

Early life

Freedman was born in Brooklyn, New York, to Nathan Freedman, a colour designer for an American paint manufacturer, and Rose Freedman (née Hirsch). His childhood memories included riding horses in Manhattan's Central Park. He was also inspired by colour as his Father (Colour Designer) would annually change the interior paint colour of the walls at home in Brooklyn to challenging new colours.

Education

From 1949 to 1953, Freedman attended Manhattan High School, then studied architecture at Syracuse University and began working from 1960 with architects Kahn and Jacobs, where he worked on the American Airlines' first class lounge at John F. Kennedy Airport. He abandoned the final year of his degree to travel to Europe; initially Ibiza, with a friend. During 1963 and 1964, he exhibited and sold artworks in Amsterdam and Brussels, then worked as an interior designer for architects Tandy Halford and Mills in London.
Returning to New York in 1968, Freedman joined the international planning unit of leading furniture manufacturers and interior designers Knoll and Associates. He worked with director Florence Knoll, who maintained close ties with many European and American leaders of modern design. Freedman's projects with Knoll included the United States pavilion in Japan for the Osaka World Fair (1970) as well as offices for accountants Price Waterhouse in Buffalo, New York.

Life in Australia

In 1969, Knoll despatched Freedman to 'Manhattanise and Internationalise' Sydney at the executive offices and boardrooms for the Bank of New South Wales, one of Australia's oldest banking institutions (founded in 1817 and renamed Westpac in 1982).

While working on this project, Freedman began a personal relationship with prominent Sydney decorator Neville Marsh—who employed him as a designer with Neville Marsh Interiors in 1970. To exploit Freedman's international experience, they agreed that the practice should 'go modern', and in 1973, the business was rebranded Marsh Freedman Associates (MFA).

As well as designing interiors for some of Sydney's most prestigious and prosperous families, MFA created sophisticated fine dining rooms for some of Sydney's outstanding restaurateurs, notably Anne Taylor (Taylors, 1984); Tony and Gay Bilson (Berowra Waters Inn, 1976; Kinselas, 1983; Tresury, 1992, and Ampersand, 1998; Damien and Josephine Pignolet (Claudes, 1981); Helen and Malcolm Spry (Chez Oz, 1985); Leon Fink (Bilsons and Quay, 1986, 1988), and Armando Percuoco (Buon Ricordo Ristorante refurbishment, 2007).

During the late 1980s, Neville Marsh retired from Marsh Freedman Associates and Freedman continued to practice as George Freedman Associates (with Robert Chester and Sam Marshall). In 2002 he appointed a younger architect, Ralph Rembel, as his business partner and renamed the practice 'Freedman Rembel'. This practice was dissolved in 2010, when Freedman joined architects Peddle Thorp and Walker as Head of Interior Design (but he continued consulting to his existing private clients).

Personal life

Freedman was widely known for his wit, warm laugh, home cooking, Negroni's, and devotion to his dogs (Scottish Terriers owned in pairs). In New York prior to meeting Neville Marsh, Freedman lived a sophisticated lifestyle with then partner Ronald Vance. He maintained lifelong friendships with notable Americans such as George Deem. Freedman and Marsh had successful careers in addition to their personal relationship. During the 1990s Freedman cared for his partner Neville Marsh and supported by Andrew Bryan. In 2008 he exchanged vows with Peter O'Brien at Sainte-Chapelle Paris, France. The stained glass windows have rich vibrant colors and are considered among the highest achievements of the Rayonnant period of Gothic architecture. They later wed in Queenstown, New Zealand when same sex marriages became legalized. Freedman died from cancer in Sydney in 2016, aged 80.

Gallery

List of projects

1963	American Airlines First Class Lounge
1965	The Loose Box
1965–66	Bovril Group
1967	Beecham Pharmaceuticals
1968	Price Waterhouse offices
1968–1969	VIP hospitality suite in United States Pavilion for Osaka World's Fair 1970
1970	Bank of New South Wales
1971	Neville Marsh Interiors for Kim Bonython', in SIDA Rooms on View Exhibition Design
1972	Partnership Pacific headquarters
1973	Her Majesty's Theatre
1974	Hoyts Theatres
1978	Berger Vogue paint colours
1976	Berowra Waters Inn
1980	Five Ways Fusion 
1981	Price Waterhouse 
1982	Kinselas 
1982	Alexandra
1982	Kempsey Museum and Tourist Centre
1982	Magnus Nankervis and Curl
1982	204 Clarence Street Sydney
1983	Leighton House
1983	Order Imports
1983	Mayur at MLC Centre
1983	Kessel residence
1983	Nankervis residence
1984	Glo Glo's
1984	Taylor's
1985	Freedman Marsh Apartment
1986	Barrister's Chambers
1987	State Bank of New South Wales HQ
1987	Swift Apartment
1988	Powerhouse Museum 
1985	Chez Oz
1986	Apple Computers Australian HQ
1986	Senso Unico
1987	Claude's restaurant
1987	Jarrett House
1988	Australian Pavilion, Expo 88
1988	Kraanerg'
1988	Bilson's (1)
1988	Luna Park redevelopment concept
1988	Sturkey Apartment
1988	Spry House
1989	Knoll showroom at Arredorama
1990	Grand Hotel Disco
1990	Staley Apartment
1990	Fairfax Residence
1990	Dani Marti Apartment
1990	Clean Living
1990	Immediate Health Care Offices
1990	Xmas tree & Wreath Designs
1991	Soft Bruising'
1991	Mercantile & General Reinsurance
1991	Pearl Beach House
1992	Wentworth & Selbourne Chambers – level 6
1992	Videotronics – Video Stores
1992	Smouha-Ho Residence
1993	Treasury at Intercontinental Hotel
1993	Penrith Panthers Leagues Club
1993	Macquarie Bank HQ
1994	Notaras Residence
1994	Peter Johnson
1994	Boonoke 
1994	Kingsclere Apartments
1994	Centennial Park swimming pool area
1995	James Fairfax Residence
1995	Elizabeth Bay Apartment
1995	Wollahra General Practice
1996	Mirabelle 
1996	Moran Residence
1997	Thomas Residence
1997	Berg Residence
1998	Tiger Lane
1999	Ampersand 
1999	Pan Apartment(1)
2000	Miller Residence
2000	Mythologia'
2000	Thomas Residence (2)
2000	Halpern Residence
2001	Denton-Byrne Residence (Stage1)
2001	AMP HQ Executive offices and entry foyer
2001	AMP Offices
2001	Pan Penthouse (2)
2009	Queen Victoria Building 
2003	Pan Residence (3)
2003	Pan Ranch (4)
2003	Bilson's (2)
2004	Medina Grand
2004	Spry House (2)
2004	PBL Holdings (Levels 2 and 4)
2005	Quay
2005	 'Changing Spaces' exhibition at Elizabeth Bay House
2005	Double Bay House
2007	Leighton 
2005	Adagio
2006	Sea Level Restaurant
2006	Mosman House "Easterly"
2006	Freedman Apartment
2007	Buon Ricordo
2007	Tiger Lane
2007	PBL Holdings (Ground Floor Foyer & Private Dining Room)
2007	Qualia resort
2007	Onslow apartments
2008	Residence – "Finisterre"
2009	Denton-Byrne Residence (Stage 2 )
2009	Elizabeth apartments
2012	Bondi Pacific apartments
2013	Redesign of de de ce Knoll showroom for Knoll 75th anniversary
2015 Bryan Apartment

References

Bibliography 
Allenby, Guy, 2000, 'The big O', The Sydney Morning Herald (Style) 25 November, p. 8.

Allenby, Guy, 1996, 'The apartment', Belle, April–May, pp. 52–64.

Allison, Tim, Arthur Collin, Iain Halliday, Sam Marshall, Robert Pufflet, Andrew Stanic and Stephen Varady, 1995, ‘'Working with George', Monument, No. 7, p. 30.

Anderson, Greg, 1995, 'Edgecliff apartment', Monument, No. 12, pp. 68–71.

Anon, Nd., 'George Freedman b. 1936', Design and Art Australia https://www.daao.org.au/bio/george-freedman/groups/ (accessed 7 January 2017).

Anon, 2010, 'PTW Adds Freedman to its Stable', Architecture and Design (Infolink), 12 July, http://www.architectureanddesign.com.au/news/industry-news/ptw-adds-freedman-to-its-stable (accessed 9 January 2017).

Anon, 2009, 'Design catalyst: George Freedman', Inside Interior Review, No. 5, p. 58–65.

Anon, 1994, 'Elegance with a heart', The Sydney Morning Herald (Realty Guide), 29 May, p. 214.

Anon, 1991, 'Taking the frenzy out of film-festival feeding', The Sydney Morning Herald, (Good Living), 4 June, p. 48.

Anon, 1985, 'Designers and architects', The Sydney Morning Herald, 1 October,

Anon, 1985, 'Kitchens: The new criteria', Vogue Living, April, p. 52.

Anon, 1984, Untitled item, The Sydney Morning Herald (Sydney Gourmet column), 21 February, p. 5.

Anon, 1982, 'Warm coral and pale blue? School was never like this, sir!’, The Sydney Morning Herald, 4 June

Anon, 1982, 'City project shows what can be done', The Sydney Morning Herald. 1 July

Anon, 1978, 'Paint takes a turn in fashion circles', The Sun-Herald (Home Style), 7 May, p. 149.

Anon, 1978, 'The paint revival', The Sydney Morning Herald, 15 August, p. 22.

Anon, 1994, 'Freestyle', Vogue Living, December/January, pp. 190–191.

Anon 1989, 'A passion for precision', Vogue Entertaining, August/September, pp. 82–95.

Anon, 1988, 'Our taste makers', The Sydney Morning Herald, 26 May, p. 52.

Anon, 1980, 'House spread?’, Belle, September/October

Anon 1979, House spread?’ Belle, March/April

Anon, 1971, 'Rooms on view', The Sydney Morning Herald (or The Sun-Herald?)

Barker, Penny, 1999, 'Design visionaries', Belle, April/May, pp. 24–48.

Barker, Penny, 1996, 'Collective wisdom', Belle, August–September, pp. 64–71.

Barrowclough, Anne, 1982, 'Putting people first', The Australian Home Journal, October, pp. 44–51.

Beck, Haig, 1987, 'George Freedman', ASAP, Sydney, Artes Arredorama Publication.

Bogle, Michael, 'A gentleman's quarters', Interior Architecture and Design, No. 22, pp. 106–111.

Bravery, Suzanne, 2005, 'Apartment living', Insites (NSW Historic Houses Trust magazine), p. 10.

Brennan, Betsy, 1987, 'Shock treatment', Vogue Living, October, pp. 96–103.

Brennan, Betsy, 1984, 'Indoor drama', Vogue Living, April, pp. 14–16.

Broadhurst, Kate, 2006, 'Let it be', South Coast Style, May, pp. 38–47.

Bullivant, Lucy, 2009, 'Luxury in the tropics', InDesign, No. 39, pp. 156–164.

Bush, Nadine, 1997, 'Bright solution', Belle (Ultimate Colour Guide), June/July, np [86–87].

Bush, Nadine, 1994, 'Big colour', Belle, April/May, pp. 44–55.

Clark, David, 1999, 'Walking on sunshine', Belle, December/January, pp. 34–43.

Cochrane, Peter, 1988, 'Vast tour to follow Murphy's triumph', The Sydney Morning Herald, 29 April, p. 12.

Croxton, Sally, 2009, 'New face for Johns Buildings', The Newcastle Herald, 9 August, p. 8.

Cummins, Carolyn, 2002, 'Without reserve', The Sydney Morning Herald (Property), p. 68.

Dickinson, Michael, 1993, 'Guestroom', Belle, April/May, pp. 26–??

Dickinson, Michael, 1993, 'A predilection for variety', The Sydney Review, October, pp. 26–27.

Dunworth, Michaela, 1987, 'Levels of power', Belle, December/January, pp. 110–115.

Dwyer, Carmel, 1994, 'Time for a snack', The Sydney Morning Herald (Arts, Spotlight), 9 June, p. 26.

Engelen, John, 2014, 'George Freedman – A life of colour and design', De De Ce Blog, 29 January, http://www.dedeceblog.com/2014/01/29/george-freedman-a-life-in-design/ (accessed 4 November 2016).

Fish, Peter, 1994, 'Fairfax moves to cut collection', The Sydney Morning Herald (Money), 19 October, p. 33.

Foreman, Graham, 1995, 'George Freedman: A long way from Brooklyn', Monument, No. 7, pp. 18–23.

Fraser, William, 1991, 'Chefs serve up opera on a plate', The Sydney Morning Herald, 8 February, p. 2.

Freedman, George and Ralph Rembel, 1995, 'Freedman finesse', Monument, No. 7, pp. 32–35.

Friis-Clark, Annie, 1999, 'Sitting in judgement', Corporate and Office Design, Autumn/Winter, pp. 23–27.

Fry, Tony, 1987, 'The power and the glory', Architecture Bulletin (Royal Australian Institute of Architects NSW Chapter), No. 4, pp. 6–7.

Geran, Monica, 1990, 'Bilson's restaurant, Sydney', Interior Design (US), August, cover, pp. 148–153.

Goodwin, Wendy, 1987, 'Coming through with flying colours', The Sydney Morning Herald (Style), 5 November, p. 8.

Goulding, Jane, c. 1988, 'Colour coded', Belle

Greenwood, Helen, 1994, 'Designer dining', The Sydney Morning Herald (Good Living), 19 July, pp. 25, 29.

Gregg, Stacy, 1998, 'Plush life is simple', Sunday Star-Times (NZ) (Home), 31 May, p. E5.

Hardy, Justine, 1989, 'My favourite room: Style file: George Freedman', The Australian (Magazine), 21–22 January, pp. 30–42.

Haskell, John, 1985, 'Rural was a hard act to follow but they made it', The Sydney Morning Herald, 30 September, p. 12.

Hawson, Louise, 1986, 'Inside out', Interior Design (guest ed. George Freedman), No. 4, pp. 52–58.

Hayes, Babette, 1980, 'Inner-city chic', Belle, May/June, pp. 28–33.

Hayes, Babette, 1977, 'Distinctive, tailored design', Belle, May/June, pp. 57–62.

Healey, Ken, 1990, 'Murphy's law: Love is bruising', The Sun-Herald, 15 April, p. 116.

Howlin, Jan, 2001, 'Design luminaries', InDesign, October, pp. 64–67.

Hyland, Barry, 2010, 'Between the golden mile and the deep blue sea', Home Ideas, Vol, 5, No. 2, pp. 41–51.

Jackson, Davina, 1991, 'New wave: Cover up the sun', Vogue Living, February, pp. 146–149.

Jackson, Davina, 1990, 'Office fitouts', The Sydney Morning Herald (Style), 12 June, p. 1.

Jackson, Davina, 1989, 'The tin man', Belle, August/September, pp. 146–150.

Jackson, Davina, 1990, 'Off duty design', Belle, October/November, pp. 210–217.

Jackson, Davina, 1988, 'Bold moves at Barralong', Belle, December/January, pp. 112–121.

Jackson, Davina, 1988, 'Australia: Interiors', Blueprint, September, p. 49.

Jackson, Davina, 1987, 'Around the world in 80 rooms', The Sydney Morning Herald (Good Weekend), 3 January, pp. 30–35.

Jackson, Davina, 1986, 'Design goes back to the future ...’ The Sydney Morning Herald (Style), 31 July, p. 50.

Jackson, Davina, 1985, 'Well just who are the stylish men of Sydney?’, The Sydney Morning Herald (Style), 16 April, p. 49.

Jensen, Erik, 2008, 'Event picks: Furniture forum', The Sydney Morning Herald (Metro), p. 20.

Johnson, Judy, 1990, 'Some Rooms: Michael Cook', The Sun-Herald, 29 April, p. 198.

Johnson, Judy, 1990, 'Homestyle '90: Colour', The Sun-Herald (Sunday), 19 August, pp. 21–32.

Jurjans, Zinta, 1989, 'Extroverted interior', Belle, pp. 76–83.

Keens, Leta, 2002, 'The colourists', Belle, December/January, pp. 148–155.

Kennedy, Ken, 1995, 'A maestro's idiom', Monument, No. 7, pp. 24–25.

Lacey, Stephen, 2006, 'Come in and pull up an Eames', The Sydney Morning Herald (Domain), 13 April, p. 5.

Lacey, Stephen, 2004, 'Every which way', The Sydney Morning Herald (Domain), 29 July, pp. 10–11.

Laverick, Frances, 'Apple Computers', Interior Design (Office Supplement), pp. 54–69.

Lehmann, Nicole, 1996, 'Quote unquote', The Sydney Morning Herald (Domain), 25 April, pp. 10–11.

Lumby, Catharine, 1989, 'Pink and grey: It's dead', The Sydney Morning Herald, 22 August, pp. 47, 50.

Lumby, Catharine, 1989, The Sydney Morning Herald, 21 August

Macken, Lucy, 2016, 'Broadcaster to sell private fortress', The Sydney Morning Herald, 9 April, p. 6.

Malkin, Bonnie, 2005, 'The vision thing', The Sydney Morning Herald (The Sydney Magazine), June, pp. 46–53.

Marshall, Sam, 2016, 'Vale George Freedman 1936–2016', ArchitectureAU (People), 18 August, http://architectureau.com/articles/vale-george-freedman-19362016/ (accessed 4 November 2016).

Marshall, Sam, 2016, 'Remembering designer George Freedman', more space, 29 July, http://morespace.spacefurniture.com/latest-news/2016/7/29/remembering-designer-george-freedman (accessed 4 November 2016).

Niche Media, 2016, 'George Freedman', Interior Design Excellence Awards 2016, https://www.idea-awards.com.au/2010/george-freedman/ (accessed 4 November 2016).

O’Grady, Suellen and Jenny Stynes, 1989, 'Keeping the Piece (Furniture item)’, The Sydney Morning Herald (Good Weekend), 18 February, p. 258.

Olding, Rachel, 2011, 'Cart comeback: Everything rolled is new again', The Sydney Morning Herald, 13 September, p. 2.

O’Rourke, Claire, 2000, 'Earth, wind and fire', The Sydney Morning Herald (Domain), 18 May, p. 18.

Owens, Susan, 1993, 'A treasury of top artistic talent', The Sydney Morning Herald (The Diary), 3 October, p. 135.

Partridge, Des, 2005, 'Comfy with quirky style', The Courier Mail, 8 October, p. H06.

Pearson, Chris. 2016. 'Tribute: George Freedman', Vogue Living, November–December, pp. 66.

Porter, Jeni, 2003, 'The maestro's legacy', The Sydney Morning Herald (The Sydney Magazine), June, pp. 46–48.

Powell, Sian, 1990, 'Easing the sleaze effect', The Sydney Morning Herald (Good Living/Short Black), 23 October, p. 50.

Remington, Kaye, 1987, 'A marriage of true minds', Interior Design, No. 9, pp. 64–75.

Remington, Kaye, c. 1984, 'Colour block', Interior Design

Ripley, Amy, 2016, 'Master put Manhattan edge on City: George Freedman 1936–2016–, The Sydney Morning Herald (Timelines), 24 August, p. 34.(Note this obituary is retitled from her online article of 23 August 2016).

Ripley, Amy, 2016, 'George Freedman, interior designer to the rich and famous of Sydney', The Sydney Morning Herald (Obituaries), 23 August, http://www.smh.com.au/comment/obituaries/george-freedman-interior-designer-to-the-rich-and-famous-of-sydney-20160811-gqqc4n.html (accessed 4 November 2016).

Roche, Peter, 1987, 'Tops for bottoms', The Sydney Morning Herald (Style), 12 February, p. 40.

Roach, Peter, 1986, 'Heaven's gate', Interior Design (guest ed. George Freedman), No. 4,

Rowley, Tandy, 1985, 'The interior voice: On fantasy and functionalism and fun', Follow Me Gentlemen, September/November, pp. 224–229.

Salomon, Mandy, 1986, 'Chez Oz: It screams fancy but costs plenty', The Sydney Morning Herald (Style), 16 January, p. 50.

Schofield, Leo, 1995, 'Neville Marsh 1931–1994', Monument, No. 7, pp. 26–29.

Schofield, Leo, 1989, 'The eaties in review', The Sydney Morning Herald, 26 December, p. 22.

Schofield, Leo, 1988, 'Shades of Bondi: Local colour', The Sydney Morning Herald, 4 June, pp. 28–37.

Schofield, Leo, 1988, 'Kinselas goes, the memories linger on', The Sydney Morning Herald, 24 March, p. 1.

Schofield, Leo, 1987, 'Ways to mix the model of cocktails', The Sydney Morning Herald (Good Living), 8 December, p. 52.

Schofield, Leo, 1986, 'Modern Italian comes to town', The Sydney Morning Herald (Good Food Guide), 17 June, p. 4.

Schofield, Leo, 1986, 'The making of Chez Oz', The Sydney Morning Herald (Style)

Simpkin, Julie, 1998, 'Sydney artist', Vogue Living Apartments, No. 4, pp. 72–78.

Spence, Rory, 1989, 'Court of Murcutt', The Architectural Review (UK), March (Vol. 185, No. 1105), pp. 87–91.

Spence, Rory, 1985, 'Regional Identity: Offices Woolloomooloo', The Architectural Review (UK), December, pp. 23–34.

Stewart, Meg, 1985, 'The men behind the black bathrooms at the State Bank', The Sydney Morning Herald (Good Weekend), 20 July, pp. 24–28.

Sykes, Jill, 1999, 'Shocks in store', The Sydney Morning Herald, 27 December, p. 13.

Sykes, Jill, 1990, 'Bruising shows problems', The Sydney Morning Herald (Arts), 9 April, p. 16.

Tanner, Howard, 1982, 'Gallery beats the Aussie office blues', The Sydney Morning Herald (Architecture), 19 August, p. 10.

Tanner, Howard, 1983, 'How Sydney is being coloured up', The Sydney Morning Herald (Architecture), 12 September

Thomas, Claudia, 1985, 'Exacting exercise', Vogue Living, April, pp, 84.

Truppin, Angela, 1986, 'Dramatic display', Interiors, February, pp. 112

Vernon, Kath, 1993, 'George Freedman', TAS: The Architecture Show, January/February, pp. 21–27.

Walker-Smith, Melissa, 1991, 'Place of angels', Belle, February/March, pp. 78–83.

Walter, Elizabeth, 1985, 'They're laughing all the way to the banks', Australian Business, 15 May, pp 93–94.

Walters, Michael, 2003, 'Warm welcome', The Sydney Morning Herald (100 Amazing Homes, Part 1), 8 November, p. 18.

Webb, Michael, 1997, 'Private residence, Sydney, Australia', Interiors (US), July, pp. 74–77.

Westwood, Susan, 1989, 'Colour crazes', The Sydney Morning Herald (Style), 26 March, p. 120.

Wills, Jenny, 2009, 'Bright ideas to dress up your home', The Sunday Telegraph (Renovate Part 5), 31 August, p. R5.

Williams, Antonia, 2007, 'Order in the house', Vogue Living, November/December, pp. 270–277.

Williams, Antonia, 1998, 'The classy knoll', The Sydney Morning Herald (Domain), 26 March, pp. 5.

Williams, Antonia and Christine France, 1999, 'Ampersand', Inside Interior Review, No. 12, pp. 58

Williams, Susan, 1990, 'Spending a pretty penny', The Sydney Morning Herald, 9 October, p. 55.

Wright, Jean, 2016, 'Vale George Freedman 1936–2016', Belle, November, p. 60–61.

External links
George Freedman Blog by dedece
Herald Obituary
Adagio – Private Yacht
Qualia, Hamilton Island
Design & Art Australia reference
KNOLL International Obituary
Interior Design Excellence Awards

American interior designers
Australian interior designers
1936 births
2016 deaths
Australian Jews
Jewish architects
Modernist architecture in Australia
Modernist architects
Syracuse University alumni
Recipients of the Royal Gold Medal
New South Wales architects
Architects from Sydney
Modernist architects from the United States
Modernist designers
American industrial designers
People from Brooklyn